Daniel Alexander Jackson (born 26 April 1988) is an Australian professional basketball player who currently plays for the Canberra Gunners of the South East Australian Basketball League (SEABL). Jackson attended Illawarra Sports High School where he was honoured with Hall of Fame induction.

Professional career
In 2006, Jackson attended the Australian Institute of Sport. The following year, he played for the Canberra Gunners and subsequently earned himself a professional contract with the Wollongong Hawks for the 2007–08 NBL season. He remained with the Hawks for six seasons and averaged 1.4 points in 120 career games. During his stint with the Wollongong Hawks, Jackson spent off-seasons with the Illawarra Hawks (Wollongong's affiliated junior team), Mackay Meteors and Canberra Gunners.

Jackson returned to the Canberra Gunners in 2014 where he continued to play in 2015 and 2016.

International career
In 2007, Jackson represented Australia at the FIBA Under-19 World Championship in Novi Sad, Serbia. At that tournament, the Australian Emus finished fifth with an 8-1 record. Jackson averaged 10.2 points and 4.9 rebounds per game.

Personal
Jackson's partner is Australian Opals centre Marianna Tolo.

References

External links
NBL stats
Hawks profile

1988 births
Living people
Australian men's basketball players
Australian Institute of Sport basketball players
Forwards (basketball)
Sportspeople from Wollongong
Wollongong Hawks players